Joseph Michelli (born August 11, 1960) is an American psychologist, speaker, and author. He started his career as a psychologist in 1988. Since 2004, he has written business books, including  The Starbucks Experience, The New Gold Standard, Prescription for Excellence, and Driven to Delight.

Books

Early books
In 1998 Michelli published the book Humor, Play, and Laughter: Stress-Proofing Life with Your Kids, which discusses the use of humor in parenting. In an article featuring his book, Michelli stated that, "If we don't teach kids how to use humor to cope with the crap in their lives, then they're going to become less flexible and more rigid." Michelli entered the business books market by penning When Fish Fly: Lessons for Creating a Vital and Energized Workplace, which covered the history and business model of the Pike Place Fish Market in Seattle, Washington. Michelli cowrote the book with the owner of the business, John Yokoyama. The Chicago Tribune reviewed the book and stated that the two authors "combine for a number of 'A-ha' moments".

Starbucks

The Starbucks Experience
Michelli continued this formula for his following books. In 2006 he wrote his first book about another Seattle company, The Starbucks Experience: 5 Principles for Turning Ordinary Into Extraordinary, which reached number three on the Wall Street Journal business books bestseller list. The book centered on the business model of the Starbucks coffee company, and methods that entrepreneurs or businesspeople could take to apply the successful aspects of this model to their own careers. In the years following the book's publication, Michelli was interviewed or quoted as an outside expert on the business strategy of the Starbucks company by several publications.

Leading the Starbucks Way
A follow-up book entitled Leading the Starbucks Way: 5 Principles for Connecting with Your Customers, Your Products, and Your People was released in 2013. In this book he covers the strategies that Starbucks uses to spread its reach nationally, and advice on how other businesses can apply the same methods. Much of the book is composed of interviews with people who work at the company at various levels.

The New Gold Standard
Michelli's 2008 book The New Gold Standard: 5 Leadership Principles for Creating a Legendary Customer Experience Courtesy of The Ritz-Carlton Hotel Company focuses on the success model of the Ritz-Carlton Hotel Company. The subject matter of hotels was not foreign to Michelli, as he had spent a significant amount of time in more generic rooms on book tours and travelling as a public speaker. The question he used as the synthesis of what he was looking for within Ritz-Carlton hotels was "What's your 45-minute massage that lasts an hour?", referring to how the individual hotels decided to offer a higher value than advertised in different areas. His advice to his readers in the book was to talk personally to one's customers, and not let a lack of ability to do consumer research to get in the way of customer interactions.

Prescription for Excellence
Michelli's 2011 book about the University of California, Los Angeles health system, Prescription for Excellence, details the complexities of healthcare institutions, requiring a high level of innovation, commitment to safety, and a high level of customer service, all provided in a highly political and cost competitive industry.

ResultSource was paid to make Prescription for Excellence a bestseller, with the UCLA Health System buying copies of the book and sending them to hospital CEOs, but in its second week, "sales plunged 96%" and it dropped off the list. The book reached number four on the New York Times business hardcover list, as well as number one the New York Times hardcover advice best-seller list.

The Zappos Experience
Michelli's 2011 book The Zappos Experience: 5 Principles to Inspire, Engage, and Wow focuses on the company Zappos.com and how its business model achieved over a billion dollars in revenues over the Internet in the 2000s, after the slowing of growth for other Internet companies.

Driven to Delight 
In his 2015 book Driven to Delight: Delivering World-Class Customer Experience the Mercedes-Benz Way, Michelli tracks the transition of company focus on selling products to selling "experiences". The book appeared on the Wall Street Journal hardcover business best-sellers list.

Career

Psychology
Michelli received his undergraduate degree from the University of Denver, where he triple majored in psychology, philosophy, and political science and where he was honored as the 1981 Outstanding Junior Man. During his undergraduate studies he co-authored an article for Psychology Today entitled Would You Believe a Child Witness. In 1985 Michelli co-authored the research paper A Brief Test for Measuring Malingering in Schizophrenic Individuals that was published in the American Journal of Psychiatry. He graduated with his PhD in 1988 from the University of Southern California, completing his thesis entitled Observational Bias in Spouse Observation Integrating Cognitive and Behavioral Approaches to Marital Distress. Additional academic publications from his studies included articles in the Journal of Pediatric Psychiatry and Law and Human Behavior, as well as a chapter of the third edition for Behavioral Assessment: A Practical Handbook. Michelli is also the author of financial and economics publications.

Michelli worked as a clinical psychologist for the Penrose-St. Francis Health Care System in Colorado during the 1990s. Michelli continued his practice as a psychologist through the late 2000s, serving as a forensic psychologist in Colorado and special investigator for public prosecutions. He has also been interviewed as an expert of forensic psychology on CNN.

Radio
Joseph Michelli began his career in radio as a teenager with KRLN in Canon City, Colorado from 1973 to 1978. He then worked at KWBZ radio in Denver under the pseudonym "The Rock and Roll Kid" as an on-air host from 1979 to 1982. He took an eight-year break from radio while attending graduate and post-graduate school, but returned to radio in 1990. That year Michelli began hosting what would become a nationally syndicated radio show called Wishing You Well on the Business News Network. As a radio host, he was interviewed for major newspapers to respond to current events involving psychology. The show continued until 1999. Michelli also hosted The Joseph Michelli Show on KVOR in Colorado Springs, CO, a daily 2-hour afternoon drive talk show that ran from 1997 to 2007. Due to his work as an author, as of 2007 Michelli would host the show over the telephone on the road while doing book signings, speaking engagements, and other events. He left the show in June 2007. Upon his departure from the radio business it was claimed he had "raised the talk show bar" in Colorado, as Michelli left to work full-time on his books. Michelli's commentary on social issues was sometimes the cause of controversy. The group Media Matters stated that he had failed to deter frequent callers from making insensitive remarks about homosexuals, and had allowed a guest host for his show to make similar remarks.

Speaking
Joseph Michelli offers his services as a public speaker.

Consulting
Michelli is also a consultant that works with companies on customer retention strategies.

Personal life
Michelli married Nora Leigh Smith, with whom he had two children, Joseph Andrew and Fiona. Nora died on February 11, 2013, after a six-year battle with breast cancer.

References

External links
 

Living people
1960 births
21st-century American psychologists
20th-century American psychologists